Mari Ness (born ) is an American poet, author, and critic. She has multiple publications in various science fiction and fantasy magazines and anthologies. Her work has been published in Apex Magazine, Clarkesworld, Daily Science Fiction, Fantasy Magazine, Fireside Magazine, Lightspeed, Nightmare Magazine, Strange Horizons, Tor.com, and Uncanny Magazine. In Locus, Paula Guran said of The Girl and the House that Ness: "subverts and glorifies the clichés and tropes of every gothic novel ever written, in less than 1,800 words"

Career
Ness has been a panelist and guest at a number of science fiction conventions, most notably Worldcon 2019 in Dublin. One reviewer of the Worldcon panel where she participated, "The golden age of animated SF," commented that the members of the panel "meandered and didn’t really answer the question it posed, digressing into questions such as ‘what is genre?’ and ‘what is animation?’ before getting to some light discussion of the eponymous topic in the last 15 minutes." She has also appeared at 
OASIS 2019 in Orlando, Florida, and was scheduled to appear at CoNZealand 2020 in Wellington, New Zealand.

Ness is also noted for her critical reassessment of classic literary works. Among other analysis, she critiques the presence or lack of an appropriate disability narrative in works where characters have obvious disabilities. Her column on Tor.com, "Disney Read-Watch," which discussed Disney animated films and the classic tales that underlaid them, was a finalist for one of Reddit's 2016 "Stabby" Awards, given by the r/Fantasy subreddit for works related to the genre.

Her work has appeared in several anthologies, some of which have been reviewed in Publishers Weekly.  Her novelette, "The Ceremony", published in Fireside Quarterly in 2018, was on Locuss recommended reading list in 2018. Her fiction that appeared in Lightspeed was noted favorably by Locus in 2017.

Personal life
She lives in central Florida, though she has lived in upstate New York previously. Ness is a wheelchair user due to postural orthostatic tachycardia syndrome and vertigo. On occasion her experience with these informs her characters and stories and so too does her interests in technology and mythology and how they can resolve or cause issues. She also uses her position to call out events which are insufficiently accessible for people with disabilities.

Works

Print anthologies

 "The heart of the flame" (Poetry, 2016) in Vitale, Valeria, and Djibril al-Ayad. Fae Visions of the Mediterranean: An Anthology of Horrors and Wonders of the Sea.Futurefire.net Publishing.
 "Memories and wire." (Short Story, 2014) in Clarke, Neil. Upgraded  Stirling, New Jersey: Wyrm Publishing.
 "And the Hollow Space Inside" (Short Story, 2012) republished in Clarke, Neil, and Sean Wallace, Clarkesworld Year Six (2014). Stirling, New Jersey: Wyrm Publishing.
 "Do Not Imagine" (Short story, 2012) in Moreno-Garcia, Silvia, and Paula R. Stiles, Future Lovecraft. Gaithersburg, MD: Prime Books.
 "Snowmelt" (Poetry, 2011) republished in  Gardner, Lyn C. A., et al., The 2012 Rhysling Anthology: The Best Science Fiction, Fantasy, and Horror Poetry of 2011. (2012) Covina, CA: Science Fiction Poetry Association.
 "Twittering the Stars" (Short Story, 2010) in  De Vries, Jetse, and Jason Andrew, Shine: an anthology of near-future, optimistic science fiction. Oxford: Solaris.

Novellas 
In the Greenwood: a tor.com original. (2014) New York: Tor.

Collections
Through Immortal Shadows Singing (lyric poetry, 2017) West Yorkshire, UK: Papaveria Press
Tongues of Fire (Short stories, 2002) Shadowwater Press

Short Fiction

Letter to an Overly Ambitious Alien Chef of the Future (2005)
Kittensplodge and the Awful Correspondence (2006)
Assistant (2007)
End of Time (2007)
The Shadow in the Mirror (2008)
Wooden Apologies (2009)
Playing with Spades (2009)
Rumpled Skin (2009)
Ravens (2010)
Sparks (2010)
Mademoiselle and the Chevalier (2010)
In the Pits of Isfhan (2011)
Dreams of Elephants and Ice (2011)
Sister and Bones (2011)
Love in the Absence of Mosquitoes (2011)
Green (2011)
Trickster (2011)
Twelve Days of Dragons (2011)
Copper, Iron, Blood and Love (2012)
A Different Rain (2012)
Nameless (2012)
The Agreement (2012)
A Cellar of Terrible Things (2012)
Shattered Amber (2012)
Labyrinth (2012)
Safe (2012)
Marmalette (2013)
Palatina (2013)
The Godmother (2013)
The Princess and Her Tale (2013)
Stronger Than the Wind, Stronger Than the Sea (2013)
Seaweed (2013)
The Gifts: Part One (2013)
The Gifts: Part Two (2013)
The Gifts: Part Three (2013)
An Assault of Color (2013)
In the Greenwood (2013)
The Dragon and the Bond (2013)
Ink (2014)
Toads (2014)
Undone (2014)
Coffin (2014)
Death and Death Again (2014)
Beans and Lies (2014)
The Knot (2015)
The Fox Bride (2015)
Inhabiting Your Skin (2015)
The Dollmaker's Rage (2015)
Sometimes Heron (2015)
The Petals (2015)
Sea Dreams (2015)
The Forge (2015)
The Huntsmen (2016)
Cat Play (2016)
The Game (2016)
My Own Damn Heaven (2016)
Deathlight (2016)
Mistletoe and Copper, Water and Herbs (2016)
The Middle Child's Practical Guide to Surviving a Fairy Tale (2016)
Coffee, Love and Leaves (2016)
Dragonbone (2016)
Nine Songs (2016)
The Cat Signal (2016)
Souls (2016)
Hundreds (2016)
The Lion (2017)
We Need to Talk About the Unicorn in Your Back Yard (2017)
The Witch in the Tower (2017)
Stealing Tales (2017)
Gingerbread Smoke (2017)
You Will Never Know What Opens (2017)
Pipers Piping (2017)
Purchases (2018)
Shadows and Bells (2018)
The Sword (2018)
Memories of Monsters (2018)
The Ceremony (2018)
Mercy (2018)
Feather Ties (2019)
The Girl and the House (2019)
The Wolf (2019)
Transformation, Afterwards (2019)

Poetry

Waiting (2008)
Ino (2009)
Dancing (2010)
Sleep (2010)
Quoth the Cultist (2010)
Grandma and the Puka (2011)
Nile Song (2011)
Soul Streets (2011)
Encantada (2011)
Raven Singing (2011)
Silence (2011)
Petals (2011)
Frenzy (2011)
Cold Comfort (2011)
Do Not Imagine (2011)
Tongueless (2012)
Laurels (2012)
Moondance (2012)
Sisters (2012)
Gleaming (2013)
Walking Home (2013)
The Loss (2013)
Feather (2014)
The Restoration of Youth (2014)
Bone Song (2014)
Nausicca's Mother Explains It All (2014)
The Silver Comb (2014)
Demands (2014)
After the Dance (2015)
The Thirteenth Child (2015)
After Midnight (2016)
Ice (2016)
The Study (2017)
O Ippos (2017)
Through Immortal Shadows Singing (2017)
Hunter (2017)
Expecting a Dinosaur (2018)

References

Living people
21st-century American women writers
1970s births
21st-century American poets
American women poets